Vitalia Diatchenko and Irini Georgatou were the defending champions but Diatchenko decided not to participate.
Georgatou played alongside Oksana Kalashnikova, but lost in the Quarterfinals to Nina Bratchikova and Valeria Savinykh.
Unfortunately, all semifinal matches were cancelled by the supervisor, due to heavy rain and flooding.

Seeds

Draw

Draw

References
 Main Draw

Soweto Open - Doubles
2011 Women's Doubles